St. George and the Dragon  is a tempera on canvas painting by the Italian Renaissance artist Vittore Carpaccio. It is housed in the Scuola di San Giorgio degli Schiavoni of Venice, northern Italy.

History
The works dates to Carpaccio's mature period, when he was commissioned by the "scuola" (guild or corporation) of the Schiavoni (Dalmatians) to execute a cycle of nine paintings narrating the stories of their patron saints (George, Jerome, Augustine and Tryphon). The work began in 1502 and was completed in  1508.

In the 1940s, the paintings underwent restoration that has since discoloured Carpaccio's original vibrant palette to amber tones. Some works have also partially detached from their canvas support and have areas of lifting and flaking paint, as well as scratches and abrasions. In September 2019, an expected two-year conservation campaign began under the sponsorship by the non-profit organization Save Venice Inc.

Description
The painting shows the first of the three episodes dedicated to St. George's life: the other two are the Triumph of St. George and the Baptism of the Selenites. St. George is portrayed while riding a horse above a wide background, his lance piercing the dragon's head. On the right is a praying princess. A diagonal line connects the princess head, passing through the lance, to the twisted tail of the dragon.

The arid terrain of a desert, with a few bunches of herbs, is covered with the remains of the dragon's victims: the  scrawny stump of a woman, a half-devoured dress, a man with amputated limbs, a severed foot and arm, skulls and bones, both of animals and humans. The inhospitality of the place is further enhanced by the presence of vipers, lizards, toads, vultures, as well by the nearly monocromatic use of yellow and pale greens: the only bright tones are those associated with George's metal armor, the horse's harness and the princess' dress. 

In the background is a fantastic city, Silene of Libya. A crowd is looking at the scene from terraces and open pavilions.  The hills, featuring castles and rocky spurs, slope down to a harbor where are a grounded ship and a vessel crowned by a natural arch of edifices, which has parallels with fantastic creations in the Ferrara school.

See also
St. Augustine in His Study (Carpaccio)

Sources

1502 paintings
Paintings by Vittore Carpaccio
Horses in art
Religious paintings
Paintings in Venice
Paintings of dragons
Saint George and the Dragon